Édgar Antonio Méndez Ortega (born 2 January 1990) is a Spanish professional footballer who plays as a left winger for Liga MX club Necaxa.

Club career
Born in Arafo, Province of Santa Cruz de Tenerife, Méndez finished his apprenticeship with Real Madrid and made his senior debut in the 2008–09 season with the C team, in the Tercera División. He upgraded to the Segunda División B with CF Atlético Ciudad in summer 2009, and joined Betis Deportivo Balompié also in that league for the following campaign.

Méndez signed for UD Melilla still in the third tier in July 2011, and scored seven goals in his only season. In 2012 he moved to UD Almería, being assigned to the reserves.

On 20 July 2013, Méndez joined Andalusia neighbours Real Jaén in a season-long loan deal. On 25 August he made his debut as a professional, playing the full 90 minutes in a 4–2 away defeat against CD Numancia in the Segunda División.

On 28 January 2014, Méndez moved to CD Tenerife also in a temporary deal. He scored his first goal in the second division on 23 March, netting the last of a 5–0 home rout of SD Ponferradina.

In June 2014, Méndez returned to Almería and renewed his contract with the club on 16 August, being definitely promoted to the first-team squad in La Liga. He made his debut in the competition on 23 August, starting and assisting Fernando Soriano in a 1–1 home draw with RCD Espanyol.

Méndez scored his first goal in the Spanish top flight on 12 September 2014, opening the 1–1 home draw against Córdoba CF. On 7 October, he agreed to an extension until 2018.

On 1 July 2015, Méndez signed a four-year deal with neighbouring Granada CF after suffering relegation with Almería. On 15 July the following year, he terminated his contract after being sparingly used, and joined fellow league team Deportivo Alavés for three years.

On 8 February 2017, in the second leg of the semi-finals of the Copa del Rey, Méndez scored the only goal of the tie against RC Celta de Vigo, qualifying the Basques to the decisive match for the first time in their 91-year history. He came on as a 79th-minute substitute for Gaizka Toquero, and scored just three minutes later.

Méndez moved abroad on 4 July 2017, joining Mexican side Cruz Azul. On 31 January 2020, he signed a two-and-a-half-year contract with his former club Alavés.

Club statistics

Honours
Cruz Azul
Copa MX: Apertura 2018
Supercopa MX: 2019
Leagues Cup: 2019

References

External links

1990 births
Living people
People from Tenerife
Sportspeople from the Province of Santa Cruz de Tenerife
Spanish footballers
Footballers from the Canary Islands
Association football wingers
La Liga players
Segunda División players
Segunda División B players
Tercera División players
Real Madrid C footballers
CF Atlético Ciudad players
Betis Deportivo Balompié footballers
UD Melilla footballers
UD Almería B players
Real Jaén footballers
CD Tenerife players
UD Almería players
Granada CF footballers
Deportivo Alavés players
Liga MX players
Cruz Azul footballers
Club Necaxa footballers
Spanish expatriate footballers
Expatriate footballers in Mexico
Spanish expatriate sportspeople in Mexico